Thru Different Eyes is a 1942 American pre-Code drama film directed by Thomas Z. Loring and written by Samuel G. Engel. The film stars Frank Craven, Mary Howard, June Walker, Donald Woods, Vivian Blaine and George Holmes. The film was released on June 19, 1942, by 20th Century Fox.

This film should not be confused with the 1929 Fox film Thru Different Eyes, which is sometimes known by alternative titles.

Plot

District Attorney Steve Pettijohn relates the details of the murder of Jim Gardener, a banker, to a class of student attorneys. 
Gardener had refused to give his wife, Constance, a divorce. She and her boyfriend, Ted Farnsworth, tried once more to change his mind when he drew a gun on them. Farnsworth leaves; Constance stays for a short time; later, Gardner is found dead. Both Constance and Farnsworth confess to protect each other. 
Pettijohn’s niece, Sue, is worried about her missing boyfriend, Harry, who was last seen near the murder site. Harry is found and tells of his fight with an angry Gardner, but he insists he did not fire the fatal shot. Harry’s story is not believed; he is tried and convicted.
With time running out, Margie Pettijohn and Sue Boardman suspect everyone and search for and find new clues thus saving Harry and unmasking the real killer.

Cast   
Frank Craven as Steve Pettijohn
Mary Howard as Constance Gardner
June Walker as Margie Pettijohn
Donald Woods as Ted Farnsworth
Vivian Blaine as Sue Boardman
George Holmes as Harry Beach
Jerome Cowan as Jim Gardner
Charles Lane as Mott
James Flavin as Thomas
Ruth Warren as Julia
Pat O'Malley as Coroner
Irving Bacon as Stu Johnson
Charles Waldron as Doctor Whittier 
Selmer Jackson as Chaplain
Natalie Moorhead as Frances Thornton

References

External links 
 

1942 films
20th Century Fox films
American drama films
1942 drama films
Films scored by David Raksin
American black-and-white films
Films directed by Thomas Z. Loring
1940s English-language films
1940s American films